Henry William Fernehough Franklin (30 June 1901 – 25 May 1985) was an English cricketer and school headmaster.

Franklin was educated at Christ's Hospital and Christ Church, Oxford. After graduating he taught at Radley College 1924–27 and at Rugby School 1927–39. He was headmaster of Epsom College 1940–62. He was a member of the Advertising Standards Authority 1962–67.

He played cricket for Oxford University, Surrey and Essex between 1921 and 1931. He also played rugby for Oxford University and Barbarians.

References

External links

1901 births
1985 deaths
English cricketers
Essex cricketers
Headmasters of Epsom College
People from the City of Chelmsford
Sportspeople from Essex
Surrey cricketers
Oxford University cricketers
Harlequins cricketers
Oxford and Cambridge Universities cricketers
Oxford University RFC players
Barbarian F.C. players
People educated at Christ's Hospital
Alumni of Christ Church, Oxford
Schoolteachers from Essex